Obiorah Emmanuel Odita (born 14 May 1983) is a Nigerian professional footballer who plays as a striker for Serbian club Železničar Pančevo. He also holds Serbian citizenship.

Club career

Early years
Born in Enugu, Odita started out at local club Enugu Rangers, before switching to Udoji United. He subsequently moved to Serbia and Montenegro and joined First League side Javor Ivanjica in the 2003 winter transfer window. Until the end of the 2002–03 season, Odita scored one goal in nine league appearances, as the club suffered relegation to the Second League. He stayed there until the 2005 winter transfer window.

Partizan
In January 2005, Odita was officially transferred to Partizan, signing a four-year deal. He marked his competitive debut by scoring both of his team's goals in a 2–2 draw with Dnipro Dnipropetrovsk in the first leg of the UEFA Cup round of 32. In the 2005–06 UEFA Champions League Second qualifying round, Odita scored a screamer to give Partizan a 1–0 win against Sheriff Tiraspol. In January 2006, Odita was sent on a six-month loan to Javor Ivanjica. He then returned to Partizan and scored 10 league goals from 23 appearances in the 2006–07 season, while often partnering Stevan Jovetić. In June 2007, Odita moved to the United Arab Emirates and signed a two-year contract with Al Ain.

Westerlo
In January 2008, Odita was loaned to Belgian club Westerlo. He scored twice in the second half of the 2007–08 season, before returning to Al Ain. In January 2009, Odita moved back to Belgium and signed a permanent contract with Westerlo.

Later years
In the summer of 2010, Odita made a comeback to Serbia by signing with his former club Javor Ivanjica for the 2010–11 season. He later moved to China and signed with Tianjin Teda in early 2011.

After two seasons with Taraz in Kazakhstan, Odita returned to Serbia once again and joined Voždovac in the summer of 2014.

In June 2016, Odita switched to fellow Serbian club Mladost Lučani.

On 14 June 2021, it was announced that Odita has retired, only to be confirmed to have joined his former club Javor Ivanjica for the fifth time, four days later.

Statistics

Honours
Partizan
 First League of Serbia and Montenegro: 2004–05
Mladost Lučani
 Serbian Cup: Runner-up 2017–18

References

External links
 
 
 

Al Ain FC players
Association football forwards
Belgian Pro League players
Chinese Super League players
Expatriate footballers in Belgium
Expatriate footballers in China
Expatriate footballers in Kazakhstan
Expatriate footballers in Serbia
Expatriate footballers in Serbia and Montenegro
Expatriate footballers in the United Arab Emirates
FC Taraz players
First League of Serbia and Montenegro players
FK Javor Ivanjica players
FK Mladost Lučani players
FK Partizan players
FK Voždovac players
Footballers from Enugu
Kazakhstan Premier League players
K.V.C. Westerlo players
Naturalized citizens of Serbia
Nigerian expatriate footballers
Nigerian expatriate sportspeople in Belgium
Nigerian expatriate sportspeople in China
Nigerian expatriate sportspeople in Kazakhstan
Nigerian expatriate sportspeople in Serbia
Nigerian expatriate sportspeople in Serbia and Montenegro
Nigerian expatriate sportspeople in the United Arab Emirates
Nigerian footballers
Serbian SuperLiga players
Tianjin Jinmen Tiger F.C. players
1983 births
Living people